Jassita Gurung (Nepali: जस्सिता गुरुङ, born May 16, 1996 in Pokhara, Nepal) is a Nepalese actress and model. She is known for her role in Lily Bily opposite of Pradeep Khadka. Gurung was born in Nepal, but grew up in the UK with her parents and close relatives. She is currently a judge in Super Dancer Nepal along with Suren Rai and Saroj Khanal. In 2017, she was the winner of UK Dance Off.

Filmography

Awards 

|-
| 2018
| Lilly Billy
| Dcine Award 2075 – Best Debut Actor (Female) 
| 
|
|-
|2018
|Lilly Billy
|Kamana Film Award 2075 – Best Debut Actor (Female) 
|
|

References

External links 
 

Living people
British actresses
Nepalese female models
1996 births
People from Pokhara
Nepalese emigrants to the United Kingdom
British people of Nepalese descent
Gurung people